East West Bancorp is the parent company of East West Bank. It is a publicly owned company with $42.1 billion in assets as of April 18, 2019. The company’s wholly owned subsidiary, East West Bank, is the largest publicly traded bank headquartered in Southern California. It is focused exclusively on the United States and Greater China markets and operates over 120 locations worldwide, including in California, Georgia, Massachusetts, Nevada, New York, Texas, and Washington. In China, there are full-service branches in Hong Kong, Shanghai, Shantou, and Shenzhen, and representative offices in Beijing, Chongqing, Guangzhou, and Xiamen. It provides both retail and commercial banking.

On May 28, 1999, East West Bancorp completed a $13.5 million acquisition of First Central Bank, N. A. in an all-cash transaction.

History
In 1973, the East West Federal Bank (now East West Bank) was founded by F. Chow Chan, Betty Tom Chu, Richard K. Quan, Gilbert L. Leong, Philip Chow, John A Nuccio, Christopher L. Pocino, and John M. Lee. Its focus was to serve the Chinese American community in southern California.

Management 

In 1992, Dominic Ng was named the Chairman, CEO and President. He replaced Kellogg Chan, who retired.
In January 2010, Irene H. Oh was promoted to EVP and CFO. She replaced Thomas J. Tolda, who resigned. Gregory L. Guyett was appointed as the President and COO in October 2016.

References

External links 

     

International banking institutions
Companies based in Pasadena, California